Instinto may refer to:

 Instinto (album), 2012 album by Colombian singer-songwriter Maía
 Instinto (TV series), 2019 Spanish erotic thriller television series